The Water Gipsies is a 1932 British, low-budget "quota quickie" drama film directed by Maurice Elvey and starring Ann Todd, Sari Maritza and Ian Hunter. It is an adaptation of the 1930 novel The Water Gipsies by A.P. Herbert. The film was made at Beaconsfield Studios. Vivian Ellis worked as the film's composer, and later used some of the music in the 1955 stage musical adaptation of the novel.

The film also features a 22 year old Raymond Raikes in the role of sozzled Bertie Peach at the party. 
Raikes went on to become England's most celebrated director and producer of classical radio drama and the first to broadcast drama in stereo.

Cast
 Ann Todd as Jane Bell
 Sari Maritza as Lily Bell
 Ian Hunter as Fred Green
 Peter Hannen as Bryan
 Richard Bird as Ernest
 Frances Doble as Fay
 Anthony Ireland as Moss
 Barbara Gott as Mrs Green
 Moore Marriott as Mr Pewtar
 Raymond Raikes as Bertie Peach
 Harold Scott as Mr Bell
 Charles Garry as Mr Green
 Betty Shale as Mrs Higgins

References

Bibliography
 Low, Rachael. Filmmaking in 1930s Britain. George Allen & Unwin, 1985.
 Perry, George. Forever Ealing. Pavilion Books, 1994.

External links

1932 films
1932 romantic drama films
British romantic drama films
Associated Talking Pictures
Films shot at Beaconsfield Studios
1930s English-language films
Films based on British novels
Films directed by Maurice Elvey
Films set in England
Quota quickies
Works by A. P. Herbert
British black-and-white films
Films with screenplays by John Paddy Carstairs
1930s British films